Sandwich Bluff is a flat-topped mountain, 610 m, broken sharply at its west side by a steep dark bluff standing slightly west of center on Vega Island in the James Ross Island group. Discovered by the Swedish Antarctic Expedition under Nordenskjold, 1901–04. Charted in 1945 by the FlDS, and so named because a horizontal snow-holding band of rock breaks the western cliff giving it the appearance of a sandwich when viewed from the north.

Cliffs of the James Ross Island group